The 1982–83 NBA season was the 37th season of the National Basketball Association. The season ended with the Philadelphia 76ers winning the NBA Championship, sweeping the Los Angeles Lakers 4 games to 0 in the NBA Finals.

Notable occurrences

The 1983 NBA All-Star Game was played at The Forum in Inglewood, California, with the East defeating the West 132–123. Julius Erving of the Philadelphia 76ers won the game's MVP award. It was at this game that R&B singer Marvin Gaye performed his famous rendition of the "Star-Spangled Banner".
This season marked the final season for Larry O'Brien as commissioner of the NBA. In honor of his long tenure, the NBA would rename its championship trophy after him (it was originally named after the late Boston Celtics owner Walter A. Brown).
The USA Network extended their cable deal with the NBA for another two years, and ESPN shared broadcast rights with them.
The 76ers posted a 12–1 record in the playoffs, a record for highest winning percentage in the postseason (it was later broken by the 2001 Los Angeles Lakers, whose record was, in turn, later broken by the 2017 Golden State Warriors).
The Boston Celtics were swept for the first time in their playoff history, at the hands of the Milwaukee Bucks in the Conference Semifinals of the 1983 NBA playoffs. The Bucks swept the Celtics 4–0.
The 1983 NBA Finals was the last Finals to end before June 1.
This was the final season for Wilson serving as the suppliers of the official NBA game ball (a partnership that dated back to 1946); it was replaced in that capacity by Spalding in the following season, which supplied game balls to the NBA through the 2020–21 season. Wilson returned as the game ball supplier for the 2021–22 season.
Ted Stepien sold the Cleveland Cavaliers to Gordon Gund. Under Stepien, attendance at the Cavaliers' home arena at Richfield Coliseum declined, first-round picks were traded in consecutive years (which led the NBA to institute the Ted Stepien rule), and long-time announcer Joe Tait was fired (he returned following the Gund purchase). The Cavaliers had five different coaches and three consecutive losing seasons under Stepien.
On November 3, 1982, Randy Smith played in his 845th consecutive NBA game, breaking Johnny Kerr's iron man record.  The game was a 130–111 loss to the Philadelphia 76ers in which Smith started and scored 14 points.  Smith's iron man streak ended at 906 games when he played his last game with the Clippers on March 13, 1983 and was traded to the Atlanta Hawks.  The record was later surpassed by A. C. Green in 1997.
The NBA adds the NBA Defensive Player of the Year and the NBA Sixth Man of the Year Award awards.
This season saw the final season of eventual Hall of Famers' Dave Cowens, Spencer Haywood and Calvin Murphy.

Final standings

By division

By conference

Notes
z – Clinched home court advantage for the entire playoffs and first round bye
c – Clinched home court advantage for the conference playoffs and first round bye
y – Clinched division title and first round bye
x – Clinched playoff spot

Playoffs
Teams in bold advanced to the next round. The numbers to the left of each team indicate the team's seeding in its conference, and the numbers to the right indicate the number of games the team won in that round. The division champions are marked by an asterisk. Home court advantage does not necessarily belong to the higher-seeded team, but instead the team with the better regular season record; teams enjoying the home advantage are shown in italics.

Statistics leaders

NBA awards
Most Valuable Player: Moses Malone, Philadelphia 76ers
Rookie of the Year: Terry Cummings, San Diego Clippers
Defensive Player of the Year: Sidney Moncrief, Milwaukee Bucks
Sixth Man of the Year: Bobby Jones, Philadelphia 76ers
Coach of the Year: Don Nelson, Milwaukee Bucks

All-NBA First Team:
F – Larry Bird, Boston Celtics
F – Julius Erving, Philadelphia 76ers
C – Moses Malone, Philadelphia 76ers
G – Sidney Moncrief, Milwaukee Bucks
G – Magic Johnson, Los Angeles Lakers

All-NBA Second Team:
F – Alex English, Denver Nuggets
F – Buck Williams, New Jersey Nets
C – Kareem Abdul-Jabbar, Los Angeles Lakers
G – George Gervin, San Antonio Spurs
G – Isiah Thomas, Detroit Pistons

All-NBA Rookie Team:
James Worthy, Los Angeles Lakers
Quintin Dailey, Chicago Bulls
Terry Cummings, San Diego Clippers
Clark Kellogg, Indiana Pacers
Dominique Wilkins, Atlanta Hawks

NBA All-Defensive First Team:
Bobby Jones, Philadelphia 76ers
Dan Roundfield, Atlanta Hawks
Moses Malone, Philadelphia 76ers
Sidney Moncrief, Milwaukee Bucks
Dennis Johnson, Phoenix Suns (tie)
Maurice Cheeks, Philadelphia 76ers (tie)

NBA All-Defensive Second Team:
Larry Bird, Boston Celtics
Kevin McHale, Boston Celtics
Wayne Rollins, Atlanta Hawks
Michael Cooper, Los Angeles Lakers
T. R. Dunn, Denver Nuggets

Player of the week
The following players were named NBA Player of the Week.

Player of the month
The following players were named NBA Player of the Month.

Rookie of the month
The following players were named NBA Rookie of the Month.

Coach of the month
The following coaches were named NBA Coach of the Month.

References

 
 NBA